Power Radio FM 99 , commonly known as Power 99, is a private FM radio station based in Islamabad, Pakistan. It is a project of The Communicators.

History
Power99 was founded by Najeeb Ahmed and is currently owned by a group known as The Communicators. It is currently running its transmission from Islamabad, Abbottabad and Vehari. Power99 got its license from the Federal Government of Pakistan under Pakistan Electronic Media Regulatory Authority (PEMRA) and started its transmission from 23 March 2003.

Power99 started its transmission on 23 March 2003, just within three months of obtaining License from PEMRA. Its transmitter is currently installed at A-Block Blue Area, in Islamabad. Power99 is covering an aerial distance of approximately 70 km radius which enables it to cover all big and small cities and towns in and around Islamabad.

Programs
Some of the programs on Power99 include
 Hemat Javan Hai
 Broad Class - Listen to Learn
 Sada e Jahan (RNN)
 Sportage (Sports Magazine)
 Suno Moto (RNN)
 News Bulletins Every Hour (RNN)
 News Round Up (RNN)
 Tang Takor - Pashto 
 Power Drive Time
 Tea Time with U.S
 Hymns to the Silence
 Yaadon Kay Dareechay
 Lost in History
 Rajay Oran Dey Dadaye
 Dari & Pashto Show
 Aap Ka Waqt Aap Key Liye
 The Town Talk
 Mind Your Media
 Crazy Afternoon
 Whats UP
 Power Evenings
 Bachon Ka 99
 Pichlay Pehar
 Meri Khamoshi Ko Beyan Milay (RNN)
 Manzar (RNN)
 Mazboot Rishtay (RNN))

Radio hosts
 Anila Ansari

Management
 Najib Ahmed
 Fakhira Najib

Partners
 Power99 Foundation
 RNN (Radio News Network)

Stations
 Islamabad Station
 Abbottabad Station
 Vehari Station

See also
 List of Pakistani radio channels
 List of FM radio stations in Pakistan
 List of radio stations in Asia
 Pakistan Electronic Media Regulatory Authority

References

External links

Radio stations in Pakistan
2003 establishments in Pakistan